Edgar is a commonly used English given name, from an Anglo-Saxon name Eadgar (composed of ead   "rich, prosperous" and gar  "spear").
Like most Anglo-Saxon names, it fell out of use by the later medieval period; it was, however, revived in the 18th century, and was popularised by its use for a character in Sir Walter Scott's The Bride of Lammermoor (1819).

People with the given name
 Edgar the Peaceful (942–975), king of England
 Edgar the Ætheling (c. 1051 – c. 1126), last member of the Anglo-Saxon royal house of England
 Edgar of Scotland (1074–1107), king of Scotland
 Edgar Angara, Filipino lawyer
 Edgar Barrier, American actor
 Edgar Baumann, Paraguayan javelin thrower
 Edgar Bergen, American actor, radio performer, ventriloquist
 Edgar Berlanga, American boxer
 Edgar H. Brown, American mathematician
 Edgar Buchanan, American actor
 Edgar Rice Burroughs, American author, creator of Tarzan
 Edgar Cantero, Spanish author in Catalan, Spanish, and English languages, author of The Supernatural Enhancements
 Edgar Cayce, American psychic and healer
 Edgar Cheung, Hong Kong foil fencer
 Edgar F. Codd, British computer scientist
 Edgar Contreras (disambiguation), several people
 Edgar Davids, Dutch footballer
 Edgar Degas, French painter
 Edgar Eather (1886–1968), Justice of the Supreme Court of Nevada
 Edgar Fonseca, Colombian road cyclist
 Edgar Froese, German musician
 Edgar Fuller, American mathematician
 Édgar González (disambiguation), multiple people
 Edgar Grospiron, French freestyle skier and Olympic champion
 Edgar A. Guest, American poet
 Edgar N. Harwood (1854–1936), Justice of the Montana Supreme Court
 Edgar P. Jacobs, Belgian comic book creator
 Edgar Johan Kuusik (1888–1974), Estonian architect and interior designer
 Edgar Lacy (1944–2011), American basketball player
 Edgar Lungu, 6th Republican President of Zambia
 Edgar Maalouf (1934–2018), Lebanese politician 
 Edgar Martínez, American Major League Baseball player who played for the Seattle Mariners
 Edgar Meddings (1923–2020), British bobsledder
 Edgar Meyer, American bassist
 Edgar Middleton (1894–1939), British playwright and author
 Edgar Mitchell, American astronaut
 Edgar Mittelholzer, Guyanese novelist
 Edgar Morais, Portuguese actor
 Edgar Norton, English-American actor
 Edgar Wilson Nye, American humorist
 Edgar Oliver, American performance artist and playwright
 Edgar Pêra, Portuguese cinematographer
 Edgar Allan Poe, American author
 Édgar Ponce (1974–2005), Mexican actor and dancer
 Edgar Prado, Peruvian-born American jockey
 Edgar Puusepp (1911–1982), Estonian wrestler
 Édgar Ramírez, Venezuelan actor
 Edgar E. Rand (c. 1905-1955), American business executive.
 Edgar Nelson Rhodes, Canadian politician
 Édgar Humberto Ruiz, Colombian road cyclist
 Edgar V. Saks (1910–1984), Estonian historian and author
 Edgar Savisaar, Estonian politician (Keskerakond)
 Edgar Seligman (1867–1958), American-born British 6-time champion and 2-time Olympic fencing medalist
 Edgar Sengier, Belgium director of the Union Minière du Haut Katanga during World War II
 Edgar Varèse, French composer
 Édgar Velásquez, Venezuelan boxer
 Edgar Veytia, Mexican state attorney general
 Edgar Wachenheim III, American investor
 Edgar Wallace, English writer
 Edgar Winter, American musician
 Edgar Wright, British film director
 Edgar Yaeger, American artist

Fictional characters with the given name 
 Edgar, a leading character in Shakespeare's King Lear
 Edgar, a character in The Zimmer Twins
 Edgar, the computer in the 1984 film Electric Dreams
 Edgar, a farmer and alien in the 1997 science-fiction film Men in Black
 Edgar, from the YouTube video Édgar's fall
 Edgar Balthazar, the butler from the 1970 Disney animated film The Aristocats
 Edgar Bones, in the Harry Potter series of novels by J. K. Rowling
 Edgar Brodie, in the 1936 film Secret Agent
 Edgar "Egg" Cooke, a leading character in the TV series This Life
 Edgar Deems, in the 1990 film Tremors
 Edgar Diaz, in the 1983 film Scarface
 Edgar Friendly, an underground rebel leader in the 1993 film Demolition Man
 Edgar "E" Gore, in the 2012 film Frankenweenie
 Edgar Linton, a leading character from Wuthering Heights by Emily Brontë
 Edgar Roni Figaro, in the video game Final Fantasy VI
 Edgar Ross, a leading character in 2010 game Red Dead Redemption and a supporting character in Red Dead Redemption 2
 Edgar Stiles, in the television series 24
 Edgar Valden, a playable survivor in the Chinese horror game Identity V
 Edgar Poe "Snotty" Wong, in the 1987 American comedy film Revenge of the Nerds II: Nerds in Paradise

People with the surname 
 Barrie Edgar (1919–2012), English television producer
 Bruce Edgar, a former cricketer who represented New Zealand
 Campbell Cowan Edgar (1870–1938), Scottish Egyptologist and  Secretary-General of the Egyptian Museum at Cairo 
 Dave Edgar (footballer)
 David Edgar (soccer) (born 1987), Canadian footballer
 David Edgar (playwright) (born 1948), English playwright
 David Edgar (swimmer) (born 1950), American swimmer
 Don Edgar (born 1936), Australian sociologist
 Elizabeth Edgar (1929–2019), New Zealand botanist
 Frankie Edgar (born 1981), American mixed martial arts fighter
 George Edgar (academic) (1837–1913), American university president
 Irene Edgar (born 1957), Scottish lawn bowler
 James David Edgar (1841–1899), Canadian politician
 James Edgar (entrepreneur) (1843–1909), Scottish-American founder of Edgar Department Stores and the first department store Santa Claus 
 James Douglas Edgar (1884–1921), English professional golfer
 Jim Edgar (born 1946), American politician and Governor of Illinois
 Jimmy Edgar (born 1983), American electronic music artist
 John Edgar (disambiguation), several people
 Jon Edgar (born 1968), British sculptor
 Jonny Edgar (born 2004), British racing driver
 Kika Edgar (born 1985), Mexican actress and singer
 Marriott Edgar (1880–1951), British poet
 Matt Edgar (born 1986), English darts player
 Robert Allan Edgar (born 1940), U.S. federal judge 
 Robert W. Edgar (1943–2013), American politician
 Ross Edgar (born 1983), British track cyclist
 Scott Edgar (basketball) (born 1955), American basketball coach
 Thomas Edgar (MP) (by 1508–1547), English politician
 Thomas Edgar (volleyball) (born 1989), Australian volleyball player
 Thomas F. Edgar, American chemical engineer
 William Edgar (disambiguation), several people

Fictional characters with the surname
 Judge Edgar, in the Judge Dredd comic strip
 Jerome "Jerry" Edgar, in the Bosch book series as well as its TV adaptation
 Earving Edgar, in the television series The Boys
 Stan Edgar, in the 2019 television series The Boys
 Edgar Frog, a character in the film The Lost Boys

See also 
 J. Edgar Hoover, former head of the U.S. Federal Bureau of Investigation
 Edgar, standard botanical author abbreviation for Elizabeth Edgar
 Edgars (name), the Latvian language cognate of the English name
 Edgaras, the Lithuanian language cognate of the English name
 Edgardo, the Italian language cognate of Edgar

English masculine given names
English-language surnames
Estonian masculine given names
French masculine given names
Old English given names